Singu Chuli (also known as Fluted Peak) is one of the trekking peaks in the Nepali Himalaya range. The peak is located just west of Gangapurna in the Annapurna Himal. Singu Chuli is on a ridgeline originating at Tarke Kang going south. This ridge continues south of Singu Chuli to Tharpu Chuli. A climbing permit from the NMA costs US$350 for a team of up to four members. The peak requires ice climbing equipment.

References

Mountains of the Gandaki Province
Six-thousanders of the Himalayas